Kathryn Ann Moler (born  1966) is an American physicist, and current Dean of Research at Stanford University. She received her BSc (1988) and Ph.D. (1995) from Stanford University.  After working as a visiting scientist at IBM T.J. Watson Research Center in 1995, she held a postdoctoral position at Princeton University from 1995-1998. She joined the faculty of Stanford University in 1998, and became an Associate in CIFAR's Superconductivity Program (now called the Quantum Materials Program) in 2000. She became an Associate Professor (with tenure) at Stanford in 2002 and is currently a Professor of Applied Physics and of Physics at Stanford. She currently works in the Geballe Laboratory for Advanced Materials (GLAM), and is the Director of the Center for Probing the Nanoscale (CPN), a National Science Foundation-funded center where Stanford and IBM scientists continue to improve scanning probe methods for measuring, imaging, and controlling nanoscale phenomena. She lists her scientific interests and main areas of research and experimentation as:

 Single vortex dynamics in classical and high temperature superconductors,
 Spontaneous currents and vortex effects in highly correlated electron systems, and 
 Mesoscopic superconductors and currents in normal metal rings, with an increasing interest in the spin properties of such small structures.

Career

Early in her career, with John Kirtley from IBM, their research demonstrated that one of the predictions of a popular theory for high-temperature superconductivity was inaccurate by a factor of 10. In 2011 her research group placed two non-magnetic materials (complex oxides) together and discovered an unexpected result: The layer where the two materials meet has both magnetic and superconducting regions. These are two properties that are normally incompatible, since "superconducting materials, which conduct electricity with no resistance and 100 percent efficiency, normally expel any magnetic field that comes near them."  Exploration of this phenomenon will be aimed toward discovery of whether the properties co-exist uneasily, or this marks the discovery of an exotic new form of superconductivity that actively interacts with magnetism.

In May 2018, Professor Moler was named Vice Provost and Dean of Research at Stanford University, effective September 1, 2018.

Awards

  Member of the U. S. National Academy of Sciences.
  Carrington Award for Excellence in Research and Teaching
  Stanford Centennial Teaching Assistant
  William L. McMillan Award for outstanding contributions in condensed matter physics 
  Packard Fellowship 
  Leigh Page Prize Lecturer at Yale University 
  R.H. Dicke Postdoctoral Fellowship at Princeton University
  Frederick Terman Fellowship 
  Alfred P. Sloan Research Fellowship 
  Richtmyer Memorial Award 2011 
  NSF CAREER Award

Publications

 "Scanning Probe Manipulation of Magnetism at the LaAlO3/SrTiO3 Heterointerface" — Beena Kalisky: Julie A. Bert, Christopher Bell, Yanwu Xie, Hiroki K. Sato, Masayuki Hosoda, Yasuyuki Hikita, Harold Y. Hwang, and Kathryn A. Moler;
 "Critical thickness for ferromagnetism in LaAlO3/SrTiO3 heterostructures" — Beena Kalisky: Julie A. Bert, Brannon B. Klopfer, Christopher Bell, Hiroki K. Sato, Masayuki Hosoda, Yasuyuki Hikita, Harold Y. Hwang & Kathryn A. Moler;
 "Scanning SQUID susceptometry of a paramagnetic superconductor" — J. R. Kirtley: B. Kalisky, J. A. Bert, C. Bell, M. Kim, Y. Hikita, H. Y. Hwang, J. H. Ngai, Y. Segal, F. J. Walker, C. H. Ahn, and K. A. Moler ;
 "Calculation of the effect of random superfluid density on the temperature dependence of the penetration depth" — Thomas M. Lippman: Kathryn A. Moler;
 "Direct imaging of the coexistence of ferromagnetism and superconductivity at the LaAlO3/SrTiO3interface" — Julie A. Bert: Beena Kalisky, Christopher Bell, Minu Kim, Yasuyuki Hikita, Harold Y. Hwang & Kathryn A. Moler;
 "Behavior of vortices near twin boundaries in underdoped Ba(Fe1-xCox)2As2" — B. Kalisky: J. R. Kirtley, J. G. Analytis, J.-H. Chu, I. R. Fisher, and K. A. Moler;
 "Local Measurement of the Superfluid Density in the Pnictide Superconductor Ba(Fe1-xCox)2As2across the Superconducting Dome" — Lan Luan: Thomas M. Lippman, Clifford W. Hicks, Julie A. Bert, Ophir M. Auslaender, Jiun-Haw Chu, James G. Analytis, Ian R. Fisher, and Kathryn A. Moler;

Papers listed at Stanford

 Evidence for a Nodal Energy Gap in the Iron-Pnictide Superconductor LaFePO from Penetration Depth Measurements by Scanning SQUID Susceptometry
 Terraced Scanning SQUID Susceptometer with Sub-Micron Pickup Loops
 Temperature dependence of the half-flux effect
 Fluctuation Superconductivity in Mesoscopic Aluminum Rings
 Mechanics of Individual, Isolated Vortices in a Cuprate Superconductor
 Enhanced superfluid density on twin boundaries in Ba(Fe1-xCox)2As2
 A limit on spin-charge separation in high-Tc superconductors from the absence of a vortex-memory effect
 Persistent Currents in Normal Metal Rings
 Images of interlayer Josephson vortices in Tl2Ba2CuO6+d
 Magnetic field dependence of the density of states of YBa2Cu3O6.95 as determined from the specific heat

References

Living people
21st-century American physicists
Stanford University faculty
American women physicists
Superconductivity
Year of birth missing (living people)
1960s births
Members of the United States National Academy of Sciences
21st-century American women scientists
Fellows of the American Physical Society